The 1982 British League season was the 48th season of the top tier of speedway in the United Kingdom and the 18th known as the British League.

Summary
After a ten year drought Belle Vue Aces won the league pushing defending champions Cradley Heath into second place. A special performance was going to be needed to finish ahead of the star-studded Cradley Heath team and it was the consistency of the support riders which helped Belle Vue achieve this. England international Chris Morton was the heat leader but he was supported by a group of consistent scorers throughout the season that included Larry Ross (a former 5 times New Zealand champion), the former world champion Peter Collins, the Carr brothers Louis and Peter, Dane Peter Ravn and Scot Jim McMillan. Cradley Heath went on to win their third Knockout Cup in four years and the League Cup.

Hackney Wick Stadium was subject to a second fatal accident within two years when American Denny Pyeatt lost his life in a league match on 16 July. Pyeatt riding for Reading Racers crashed into a lamp standard. Swindon rider Martin Hewlett suffered a stroke after the Swindon v Birmingham fixture in September and died four days later.

Final table
M = Matches; W = Wins; D = Draws; L = Losses; Pts = Total Points

British League Knockout Cup
The 1982 Speedway Star British League Knockout Cup was the 44th edition of the Knockout Cup for tier one teams. Cradley Heath Heathens were the winners.

First round

Quarter-finals

Semi-finals

Final
First leg

Second leg

Cradley were declared Knockout Cup Champions, winning on aggregate 81-75.

League Cup
The League Cup was split into North and South sections. The two-legged final was won by Cradley Heath Heathens beating Ipswich Witches in the final 83-73 on aggregate.

South Group

North Group

Final

Final leading averages

Riders & final averages
Belle Vue

 10.18
 9.37
 8.78
 6.01
 5.65
 5.44
 4.98
	4.40

Birmingham

 9.89 
 9.03 
 6.20
 6.03
 6.03
 5.65
 5.23
 5.03
 4.72
 3.56
 0.80

Coventry

 9.22
 9.09
 7.38 
 6.69
 5.79
 5.19
 3.48
 3.25

Cradley Heath

 10.74
 10.18
 9.22
 7.29 
 6.67
 6.30
 3.45
 3.02
 3.00
 2.69
 1.78

Eastbourne

 9.72
 9.62
 9.18
 6.62
 3.55
 3.55
 3.37
 3.36
 3.27

Hackney

 9.38
 7.29
 6.59
 6.53
 5.96
 5.53
 4.00
 3.52

Halifax

 11.03
 7.52
 7.28
 6.39 
 5.51
 5.36
 4.98
 4.71
 0.80

Ipswich

 10.10 
 8.53
 7.77
 6.98
 6.07
 5.79
 5.67
 5.16
 4.40

King's Lynn

 9.65
 9.09
 7.00
 5.78
 4.90
 4.04
 3.00
 1.76
 1.58
 0.44

Leicester

 8.77
 7.07
 6.42
 5.93
 5.87
 5.57
 5.41
 5.09

Poole

 8.68
 8.13
 6.01
 5.86
 5.83
 5.30
 4.49
 4.20
 3.29

Reading

 9.96 
 9.83 
 5.57
 5.28
 5.23
 5.08
 4.66
 4.00
 3.87
 2.78

Sheffield

 9.55
 6.84
 6.50
 6.48 
 6.46
 5.57
 4.95
 3.82
 1.71

Swindon

 9.47
 7.58
 6.46
 5.97
 5.26
 5.19
 4.18
 4.13
 3.26

Wimbledon

 8.77
 8.75
 8.04
 5.82
 5.37
 5.37
 5.09
 4.08
 2.06

See also
List of United Kingdom Speedway League Champions
Knockout Cup (speedway)

References

British League
League
British League